Kate Hodge is an American actress and film producer.

Life and career
Hodge was born in Berkeley, California,

Her first starring role was as Michelle, the heroine of the 1990 horror film Leatherface: The Texas Chainsaw Massacre III. She then portrayed tormented college student Randi Wallace in the syndicated horror series She-Wolf of London (1990–1991), which was later retitled Love and Curses. At the end of one early episode, when Randi and Professor Matheson (Neil Dickson) are pulling away in a car, she asks him if they can stop to rent Leatherface: Texas Chainsaw Massacre III, an in-joke and reference to Hodge's earlier movie role.

From 2000–2001, Hodge played FBI Agent Annie Price on Level 9. She has also been in the films Rapid Fire (1992) opposite Brandon Lee, Desire (1993), The Hidden II (1994), Three Women of Pain (1997), and the independent movie I Will Avenge You, Iago! (2005) as Eve. Her television movies include Love Kills (1991), Pandora's Clock (1996), and Enough About Me (2005).

She has made appearances in several television series, including thirtysomething (1989), Tales from the Crypt (1990), Ellen (1994–1995), Cupid (1998), and Summerland.

Hodge portrayed Libby Schuster in The George Wendt Show (1995) and Gretchen Lafayette in The Louie Show (1996). She was also seen in Manhattan, AZ (2000) as Jane Pentowski. She was a series regular for ten episodes of the Fred Savage show Working (1998). Her character, Chris Grant, was originally introduced as a woman pretending to be a man in order to gain respect in the business world.

In addition to acting, Hodge has also produced two films, The Perfect Stranger (2005) and Black Velvet Pantsuit (1995), where she served as co-executive producer.

Filmography

Film

Television

References

External links

Living people
20th-century American actresses
21st-century American actresses
Actresses from Berkeley, California
American film actresses
Film producers from California
American television actresses
American women film producers
Year of birth missing (living people)